The following is a list of episodes from the Captain Planet and the Planeteers animated series. The show was the second longest-running cartoon series of the 1990s, with a production of 113 episodes. The final 13 episodes of the show were first released in Europe, but they were not shown in the United States of America until Earth Day in 2006 on the Boomerang network.

Series overview

Captain Planet and the Planeteers episodes

Season 1 (1990–91) 
LeVar Burton does the opening narration.

Season 2 (1991–92)

Season 3 (1992) 
The opening dialogue is changed to have Linka located in Eastern Europe, since the Soviet Union went defunct.

The New Adventures of Captain Planet episodes

Season 4 (1993–94) 
David Coburn does the opening narration, instead of LeVar Burton. The planeteer's outfits have been changed, with the exception of Gi and Ma-Ti.

Season 5 (1994–95)

Season 6 (1995–96) 
This is notable that in season six, the opening dialog was replaced by a new rap theme. Also, the Planeteers' clothes were updated to look more modern and the animation improved considerably. Linka's eye colour changed from blue to green and Gi's hair is longer.

References

External links 
 
 Captain Planet Episode Listing
 
 

Captain Planet